Margarita Gleba is an archaeologist and expert on early textiles and other organic materials. 

Gleba holds a BS (1997) in biology and art history from Rutgers University, followed by a MA (1999) and PhD (2004) in archaeology from Bryn Mawr College, the latter supervised by Jean MacIntosh Turfa. Her research uses  scientific methods in archaeology and focuses on the pre- and protohistory of the peoples and cultures of the Mediterranean region, in addition to the archaeology of organic materials.

From 2005 to 2009 she was research project manager at Copenhagen University, followed by a Marie Curie Intra-European Fellowship at the Institute of Archaeology University College London. After that she received a European Research Council Starting Grant (2013-2019), conducted at Cambridge University named 'PROduction and CONsumption: Textile Economy and Urbanisation in Mediterranean Europe 1000-500 BCE'. In 2019 Gleba was a featured guest in a BBC Radio broadcast focused on the Scythians. In 2020 she was a lecturer at Ludwig-Maximilians-University of Munich, before becoming Assistant Professor at the University of Padua in 2021.

Publications
 Gleba, Margarita. Textile production in pre-Roman Italy, (Ancient textiles series; 4) Oxford [England]: Oxbow Books; Oakville, Connecticut: David Brown Book Company, 2008. .
 Gleba, Margarita and Hilary Wills Becker, eds. Votives, places and rituals in Etruscan religion, studies in honor of Jean MacIntosh Turfa, Leiden; Boston: Brill, 2009. .
 Gleba, Margarita, and Ulla Mannering, eds. Textiles and Textile Production in Europe: From Prehistory to AD 400. Oxford; Oakville: Oxbow Books, 2012. Accessed March 22, 2021. http://www.jstor.org/stable/j.ctvh1djwg.

References 

Linguists of Etruscan
Bryn Mawr College alumni
Rutgers University alumni
Classical archaeologists
Women classical scholars
Living people
Year of birth missing (living people)